Idle is a residential suburban area in the city of Bradford, West Yorkshire, in England and was a separate village, and before that it was the Manor of Idle.
Idle is loosely bordered by the areas of Eccleshill, Wrose, Thackley, Apperley Bridge, and Greengates, in the north-east of the city.

History 

The Manor of Idle contained the villages of Idle and Windhill and hamlets of Thackley, Thorpe-Green, Parkhill, Cross-Keys, Buckmill, and Wrose.
The Manor of Idle was bounded by the River Aire in the north and in the east Pighill Beck (now named Haigh Beck) up to Blakehill Tongue and across westwards down a small beck to Bradford Beck.
The name is thought to be a corruption of Idlawe meaning Ide's Hill, where Ida is supposed to be an Anglo Saxon settler. Thorpe middle school is in the centre of the village.

Church history 

Idle was once part of the parish of Calverley but in 1584 a chapel of ease was built on Town Lane and later in 1630 rebuilt on the same site.
The building is now known as Old Chapel.
A school was added to the western end of Old Chapel and later in 1836 was rebuilt as Round Steps School.
The school building also contained a lockup and the town's offices, and was also used by the Mechanics Institute.
It was demolished in the late 19th century.
In 1914 there was a move to demolish Old Chapel to widen the road to improve access however there was a successful campaign to oppose this and preserve the Old Chapel.

In 1717 Upper Chapel was built on Westfield Road by dissenters, rebuilt in 1790 and rebuilt again in 1850.
This was demolished in 1953 and rebuilt again becoming the United Reformed Church in 1972.
The Primitive Methodist Church was established on Town Lane in 1861. Later the property was used by the Idle branch of the YMCA but was demolished later and housing built on the site.

Thorpe Methodist Chapel was built in 1814 and a new chapel built in 1871 then demolished circa 1981 and a modern chapel built on the site.
Holy Trinity Church was built off Town Lane in 1830 and later the graveyard was extended into land between the church and The Grange previously occupied by Church Farm.
In 1858 the Unitarian Church was built on Highfield Road but was later demolished.
St John's Church was built on Cavendish Road but this has now been demolished.
The Idle Baptist Chapel was built on Bradford Road in 1810
and the Idle Baptist Church was built in 1875 but was demolished in 1983.

The Salvation Army came to Idle in 1884 and took up residence in the Old Green Mill in Idle Green.
In 1890 the foundations were laid for the present Idle Citadel Salvation Army Worship Hall on Walter Street: the builders were Messrs Obank & sons of Thackley.
The hall was opened in April 1893.
In 1999 a new community hall was built adjoining the main hall over the site of the old air-raid shelter.
The Idle Spiritualist Church was established on Highfield Road in the former premises of the White Hart Inn.

Industrial and transport history 

Idle's early local industry was based on coal measures and quarrying.
Stone was exported using the canal and later on the railway.
Mills in the Idle area include Old Green Mill, Butt Lane Cotton Mill, Union Mills, Simpson Green Mill or Castle Mill, New Mill and Albion Mill.
Idle was served at different periods by two railway stations firstly the Idle (L&BR) railway station
in Thackley on the Leeds and Bradford line during 1847-48, and then the Idle railway station in central Idle on the Great Northern Laisterdyke—Shipley line between 1875 and 1968.
The railway opened to goods in 1874 and to passengers in 1875.

Idle's workhouse was on Windhill Old Road in Thackley.
Watmough's printers was founded in 1888 and had premises on High Street.
The business closed and the buildings demolished to make way for housing.
A tram service operated from Bradford to Thorpe Garth from 1901 to 1931 after which a trolley bus service started.

Jowett Cars Ltd had a car factory in Bradford Road, Idle until 1954.
Jowett then sold the factory to International Harvester who made tractors at the site until the early 1980s.
The factory was demolished after International Harvester closed it, and the site is now occupied by Enterprise 5, a retail complex largely consisting of independent units, McDonald's and a Morrisons supermarket.
Rank Leak Wharfedale had a site on Highfield Road manufacturing Hi-Fi equipment.
The Idle Picture Palace (cinema) opened in 1912 located in existing buildings on The Green.
Circa 1930 sound was installed and in 1955 a wide screen, but it closed in 1959 to reopen as a Bingo hall but the building was demolished in 1970/71.
In more modern times there was a Hillards Supermarket off Idlecroft which later became Dunnes Stores.
The premises remained unoccupied after Dunnes closed in 2015.
The site has been developed and is now split between Home Bargains and Aldi.

Geography 

The borders between the village and its neighbouring areas are not particularly well defined, but there are three distinct areas in the village: the mainly working class area of Thorpe Edge to the south east of the village; the middle class area, centred on the main roads of Highfield Road and Town Lane, west of the village; and the middle class area centred on the main road of Leeds Road, east of the village.
To the extreme west of the village, immediately on the border with the area of Wrose, is the mostly rural Idle Moor.
This is a particularly hilly area of the village and provides views over the River Aire valley towards Shipley and Baildon.

The village centre consists of a small village green, around which are various shops, banks, a pubs and eateries.
In the area leading away from the village centre towards Leeds Road, there is a recreational area including football fields, tennis courts, a bowling green and a children's play area.
This is known locally as the Idle Rec.
Idle and The Green is a conservation area.

Governance 

Idle was a chapelry in the ancient parish of Calverley in the West Riding of Yorkshire.  In 1866 it became a separate civil parish, and in 1894 briefly an urban district, but in 1899 it was included in Bradford when it became a city.
Today the village is located in the ward of Idle and Thackley.
The village is also located in the newly created parliamentary constituency of Bradford East, and the former constituency of Bradford North.

Landmarks 

Leading down to the village from Highfield Road is the main High Street, with businesses and pubs, a medical centre
and dental practice.

On the High Street is the 'Idle Working Men's Club' built in 1928.
To outsiders this is perhaps the best known feature of the village, as when read out the name erroneously implies that the club provides a place for 'idle' or lazy working men to drink, rather than simply being a working men's club in the village of Idle.
The unique name has acquired the club a cult status around the world, with many clamouring for an official 'Idle Working Men's Pass'.
The membership exceeds 1,000,
a large number considering the decline of similar working men's clubs throughout the north of England.
Women were allowed to become members in 1995.
There are over a dozen public houses and bars in Idle.
The Post Office is on Bradford Road
and West Yorkshire Police's Eccleshill Police Station is in Idle.
On Leeds Road is the Bradford branch of the British Red Cross.
Idle's War Memorial in the lytch gate of the Holy Trinity Church in Town Lane memorialises the 215 men who died in both world wars.

Many of the houses and buildings in Idle village date back almost a century, and provide a significant remnant of Bradford's expansion during the Industrial Revolution.
Idle's listed buildings can be found around Albion Road,
Bradford Road,
Cross Road,
The Green,
Greenfield Lane,
Highfield Road,
High Street,
Howgate,
Ley Fleaks Road,
Town Lane,
and Westfield Lane.

Under the western part of Idle runs the Frizinghall to Esholt sewage tunnel.
One of the tunnel's ventilation shafts is located at the edge of the Hepworth and Idle Cricket Club's cricket field off Westfield Lane.
A TV repeater transmitter is located near Idle Hill in Idle Moor.

Churches 

On Town Lane is Holy Trinity Parish Church, a large, impressive Victorian church dating from 1830
complete with graveyard and bell tower.
Idle Upper Chapel is on Westfield Lane
and Idle Baptist Church is on Bradford Road.

Education 

On Leeds Road is Immanuel CE Community College.
Idle C.E. Primary School is on Boothroyd Drive,
and Thorpe Primary School in Albion Road.
The Stage 84 Performing Arts School is located in premises on Town Lane.
Blakehill Primary School is on Highfield Road.
Idle's branch library is on Albion Road.

Sport 

The village was home to several cricket pitches which hosted a number of teams, including Hepworth & Idle CC.
The village has a football team with multiple age groups such as under 14s and younger.

Home of ocean rowing pair, Chris Nicholl and James Tordoff, of Team “Hell Oar High Water” who completed the 2019 Talisker Whisky Atlantic Challenge in a time of 44 days 21 hours and 58 minutes.

Culture and events 

Musical groups in the area include the Idle and Thackley Operatic Society
and the Idle Bell Ringers.
The Idle Beer Festival is held at the Hepworth and Idle Cricket Club. Stage 84 school of performing arts and ND Dance academy.

Notable people 

See the category People from Idle.

Joseph Whitworth (1803–1887) engineer and entrepreneur, was educated at William Vint's Academy in Idle.
Sir Robert Jennings (1913–2004) ("Robbie") QC, former President of the International Court of Justice and one time Whewell Professor of International Law at Cambridge University, was born and educated in Idle and spent his whole upbringing there until he won the scholarship to Cambridge which set him on his career.

English actor Michael Rennie (1909–1971) best known for playing Klaatu in The Day the Earth Stood Still was born in Idle
as was Vic Feather, Trades union leader in 1908.
Adrian Edmondson comic actor, writer, musician and director, was born in nearby Wrose but grew up in Idle.
Hannah Midgley, former Emmerdale actress has lived in Idle for most of her life.
Dickie Watmough, former Bradford City, Blackpool and Preston North End footballer was born in Idle.
Yorkshire and England cricketer Doug Padgett was born in Idle and played for Idle Cricket Club.

See also
Listed buildings in Idle and Thackley

References

External links 

 Visions of Britain
 

Areas of Bradford
Former civil parishes in West Yorkshire